USS Propus (AK-132) was a , converted from a Liberty Ship, commissioned by the US Navy for service in World War II. She was first named after Frederick Tresca, a French-born lighthouse keeper, sea captain, pioneer shipping man, and Union blockade runner in Florida. She was renamed and commissioned after Propus, a star in the constellation Gemini. She was responsible for delivering troops, goods and equipment to locations in the war zone.

Construction
Frederick Tresca was laid down 31 January 1944, under Maritime Commission (MARCOM) contract, MC hull 2471, by the St. Johns River Shipbuilding Company, Jacksonville, Florida; she was sponsored by Lieutenant  Virginia P. Tresca, the great-granddaughter of the namesake, and launched 29 March 1944; chartered by the US Navy, 10 April 1944; she was converted by Merrill-Stevens Drydock & Repair Co., Jacksonville; and commissioned 22 June 1944.

Service history 
Following shakedown in Chesapeake Bay, Propus proceeded via the Panama Canal, to the Pacific Ocean. In 1944, she operated at San Francisco, California, in September; Pearl Harbor and San Francisco, in October; and San Pedro, in December. In 1945, her cargo duties took her to Noumea and Espiritu Santo, in January; Pearl Harbor, San Francisco, and back to sea in February and March; Eniwetok, Saipan, and Tinian in April; San Francisco in May; Manus in June; Emirau and Manus in July; Pearl Harbor in August; San Francisco in September; and Norfolk, Virginia, in October 1945.

Decommissioning
Decommissioned 20 November 1945, she was redelivered to the War Shipping Administration 21 November, and struck from the Naval Vessel Register 5 December. Her name reverted to Frederick Tresca, and she entered the James River Reserve Fleet, in Lee Hall, Virginia. She was struck from the Navy List 5 December 1945. She was sold for commercial use to Nicolas G. Nicolaou, 17 March 1947, for $544,506. She was withdrawn from the fleet on 20 March 1947.

Merchant service
Frederick Tresca was renamed Nicolaou Georgios and reflagged in Greece. She was abandoned in the Red Sea, on 24 May 1951, because of a fire. Achille Lauro bought her in 1951, and had her towed to Italy, for repair and to be re-engined at Trieste. She was refitted with a  Babcock & Wilcox diesel engine that had been built by Harland and Wolff in 1940. Nicolaou Gerogios was renamed Gabbiano and reflagged in Italy. She was scrapped in 1970.

Military awards and honors
No battle stars are indicated for Propus in current Navy accounts. However, her crew was eligible for the following medals:
 American Campaign Medal
 Asiatic-Pacific Campaign Medal
 World War II Victory Medal

References

Bibliography

External links
 

 
 

Crater-class cargo ships
World War II auxiliary ships of the United States
Ships built in Jacksonville, Florida
1944 ships
Maritime incidents in 1951